= Murder of Devarakonda Harish =

Honor killing in Telangana, India

The murder of Devarakonda Harish Kumar occurred in the Indian state of Telangana. Harish was murdered in an honour killing as he, a Dalit, had eloped with Manisha, a girl of another caste and intended to marry her. The killing was done by Manisha's brother Deendayal and others.

== Background ==
Devarakonda Harish was a DJ sound system operator. Harish lived in Sooraram, Hyderabad, while Manisha lived in Ziyaguda in Hyderabad. Despite being warned by Manisha's family they continued with their relationship. They eloped on 22 February 2023 and rented a house in Petbasheerabad, Hyderabad. Manisha's brother Deendayal came to know of the relationship after he saw Manisha talking to Harish on Instagram.

== Murder ==
On 1 March 2023, Deendayal and a group of his friends ambushed Harish on motorcycles and stabbed him with knives. Harish sustained head and chest wounds and died at the scene.
